Szechuanella is an extinct genus of corynexochid trilobite that lived marine environments from the middle Cambrian to the early Ordovician in what is now China.

Sources 
Trilobite info (Sam Gon III)

External links
 Trilobite info (Sam Gon III)

Leiostegiina
Corynexochida genera
Cambrian trilobites
Cambrian first appearances
Ordovician extinctions
Cambrian trilobites of Asia
Ordovician trilobites of Asia